The Miss New York Basketball honor recognizes the top high school basketball player in the state of New York. The award is presented by the Basketball Coaches Association of New York, Inc, which consists of basketball coaches at the scholastic and collegiate levels from throughout the entire state.

Award winners

Schools with multiple winners

See also
 Mr. New York Basketball

References

Mr. and Miss Basketball awards
High school sports in New York (state)
Awards established in 1986
Women's sports in New York (state)
Basketball players from New York (state)
Lists of American sportswomen
Lists of people from New York (state)
Miss New York Basketball